The Oakland Athletics' 1983 season involved the A's finishing 4th in the American League West with a record of 74 wins and 88 losses.

Offseason 
 October 9, 1982: Jack Daugherty was signed as an amateur free agent by the Athletics.
 November 4, 1982: Mickey Klutts was released by the Athletics.
 December 13, 1982: Kevin Bell was released by the Athletics.
 December 20, 1982: Preston Hanna was released by the Athletics.
 January 11, 1983: Steve Howard was drafted by the Athletics in the 8th round of the 1983 Major League Baseball Draft.
 January 17, 1983: Brian Kingman was purchased from the Athletics by the Boston Red Sox.
 March 28, 1983: Bob Owchinko was released by the Oakland Athletics.

Regular season

Season standings

Record vs. opponents

Notable transactions 
 June 6, 1983: 1983 Major League Baseball Draft
Greg Cadaret was drafted by the Athletics in the 11th round. Player signed June 11, 1983.
Rob Nelson was drafted by the Athletics in the 1st round (7th pick) of the Secondary Phase.
 June 15, 1983: Matt Keough was traded by the Athletics to the New York Yankees for Ben Callahan, Marshall Brant, and cash.
 July 22, 1983: Kelvin Moore was traded by the Athletics to the New York Mets for Scott Dye (minors).

Roster

Player stats

Batting

Starters by position 
Note: Pos = Position; G = Games played; AB = At bats; H = Hits; Avg. = Batting average; HR = Home runs; RBI = Runs batted in

Other batters 
Note: G = Games played; AB = At bats; H = Hits; Avg. = Batting average; HR = Home runs; RBI = Runs batted in

Pitching

Starting pitchers 
Note: G = Games pitched; IP = Innings pitched; W = Wins; L = Losses; ERA = Earned run average; SO = Strikeouts

Other pitchers 
Note: G = Games pitched; IP = Innings pitched; W = Wins; L = Losses; ERA = Earned run average; SO = Strikeouts

Relief pitchers 
Note: G = Games pitched; W = Wins; L = Losses; SV = Saves; ERA = Earned run average; SO = Strikeouts

Farm system 

LEAGUE CHAMPIONS: Medford

References

External links
1983 Oakland Athletics team page at Baseball Reference
1983 Oakland Athletics team page at www.baseball-almanac.com

Oakland Athletics seasons
Oakland Athletics season
Oak